Dan Vîlceanu (born February 5, 1979) is a Romanian deputy, elected in 2016. On 25 November 2021, he was sworn in as Minister of Investments and European Projects in the Ciucă Cabinet.

Between 2006 and 2009 Dan Vîlceanu was the leader of the Gorj branch of Social Democratic Youth, the youth organisation of the Social Democratic Party (PSD) of Romania.

Vîlceanu then joined the Democratic Liberal Party (PDL) to serve as General Secretary (2011–2012), first deputy chairman (2012–2013), and chairman of the Gorj branch of the party (2013–2015). After the PDL merged with the National Liberal Party (PNL), he had been serving as co-chairman/chairman of the latter's Gorj branch respectively since 2015, and as Secretary-General of the latter party since 26 September 2021.

Furthermore, he also served as Minister of Finance in the PNL-led Cîțu cabinet, between 18 August and 25 November 2021. Additionally, between 7 September and 25 November 2021, he served as acting Minister of Transport in the same cabinet.

On 2 April 2022, Vîlceanu resigned as both Minister of European Funds and PNL secretary-general.

References

1979 births
Living people
West University of Timișoara alumni
National Liberal Party (Romania) politicians
Romanian Ministers of Finance
21st-century Romanian politicians
Members of the Chamber of Deputies (Romania)
People from Gorj County
Social Democratic Party (Romania) politicians
Members of the Romanian Cabinet